Leota Morgan (sometimes credited as Leota Statten Morgan or Leota Morgan Boehm) was an American screenwriter, playwright, and writer. She was born in Missouri to Samuel Morgan and Della Quinn.

Selected works 
Films:

 The Phantom of the Turf (1928)
 Heroes in Blue (1927)
 A Light in the Window (1927) 
 The Truth About Women (1924)
 Gambling Wives (1924) 
 The Empty Cradle (1923)
 Man and Wife (1923) 
 None So Blind (1923)
 The Streets of New York (1922) 
 White Hell (1922)
 Common Sense (1920)

Plays:

 The 11th Woman
 The Streets of New York
 Banks of the Hudson
Tiger-Dove

Novels:

 Cheating Wives

References

External links

American women screenwriters
1896 births
1943 deaths
20th-century American women writers
20th-century American screenwriters